The SNCF TGV Sud-Est was a French high speed TGV train built by Alstom and Francorail-MTE and operated by SNCF, the French national railway company. A total of 111 trainsets were built between 1978 and 1988 for the first TGV service in France between Paris and Lyon which opened in 1981. The trainsets were semi-permanently coupled, consisting of two power cars (locomotives) and eight articulated passenger carriages, ten in the case of the tri-voltage sets. The trains were named after the Ligne à Grande Vitesse Sud-Est that they first operated on. They were also referred to as TGV-PSE, an abbreviation of Paris Sud-Est.

History

The TGV Sud-Est fleet was built between 1978 and 1988 and operated the first TGV service from Paris to Lyon in 1981. Formerly there were 107 passenger sets operating, of which nine were tri-current (25 kV 50-60 Hz AC - French lignes à grande vitesse, 1500 V DC - French lignes classiques, 15 kV  Hz AC - Switzerland) and the rest bi-current (25 kV 50–60 Hz AC, 1500 V DC). There were also five, later seven, bi-current half-sets - TGV La Poste - without seats which carried mail for La Poste between Paris, Lyon and Avignon. These were painted in the distinctive La Poste yellow livery.

Each set was made up of two power cars and eight carriages (capacity 345 seats), including a powered bogie in each of the carriages adjacent to the power cars.

When the trains were delivered they wore a distinctive orange, grey, and white livery. The last set to wear this livery was repainted in the silver livery similar to the TGV Atlantique sets in 2001. From 2012 trains were repainted in the new SNCF Carmillon livery. The TGV Sud-Est sets can be distinguished visually from the Atlantique and Réseau sets by less streamlined power cars, as well as different placement of the door on the bistro coach. 

Originally the sets were built to run at  but most were upgraded to  during their mid-life refurbishment in preparation for the opening of the LGV Méditerranée. The few sets which still have a maximum speed of  operate on routes which have a comparatively short distance on the lignes à grande vitesse, such as those to Switzerland via Dijon. SNCF did not consider it financially worthwhile to upgrade their speed for a marginal reduction in journey time.

Nine sets were originally delivered as all first class. Set 88 was used as a test train for synchronous traction motors then subsequently rebuilt as a tri-voltage set and renumbered 118. Set 114 was sold to SBB in 1993 and a second set in 2005. In 1995, Set 38, one of the all first class sets, was converted to an extra postal set in addition to the existing 5 half-sets.

In March 2012, a hired postal set, numbered 951, was taken to London to advertise the Euro Carex project.

In February 2013 the TGV Lyria sets (110 to 118), designed for services to Switzerland, were taken out of service. These were replaced by TGV POS sets.

In December 2019, all TGV Sud-Est sets were retired from service. In early 2020, a farewell service was run using the first production TGV set built. This train was painted in all 3 liveries that it used during its service.

In service

The TGV Sud-Est sets were originally used on services between Paris, Lyon, Marseille and other cities in the south-east of France. In 2013 there were still 55 sets in use on services to south-eastern France and on cross-country services. The remaining sets were replaced by TGV POS in late 2019.

Fleet List

Numbering
The power cars were numbered as Class 23000 dual voltage locomotives, with the trailers being numbered according to the position in the set they were allocated to. So for Set XXX they would be numbered 123XXX, 223XXX, 323XXX and so on. The triple-voltage sets were numbered similarly but as Class 33000. Postal half sets were initially numbered P1–P5, later to P7. The power cars were numbered 923001—005, similarly the intermediate vehicles added a 9 in front of number.

Names
Many of the sets received names, principally of French communes, towns and cities. The names were carried on the two non-driving motor cars at each end of the articulated rake.

Preservation

3 Powercars of the TGV Sud-Est sets are preserved along with a cab end and one complete set
Cab end of No. 53 at Cité du train, Mulhouse. 
Powercar No. 57 at the former La Chapelle depot as part of the "Grand Train" exhibition 40. 
Powercar No. 61 by the Bischheim technicenter and intended for the Cité du train, Mulhouse
Powercar No. 112 at the Railway Museum in Ambérieu-en-Bugey.
Set No. 16 used on tours celebrating the speed record of the Sud-Est in 1981

Gallery

Fleet details

See also 
 List of high speed trains

References

External links
 Spec Sheet 

Land speed record rail vehicles
Sud-Est
Electric multiple units with locomotive-like power cars
25 kV AC multiple units
1500 V DC multiple units of France
Alstom multiple units